Jaime dos Santos Serra (22 January 1921 – 9 February 2022) was a Portuguese politician.

A member of the Portuguese Communist Party, he served in the Assembly of the Republic from 1976 to 1985. He died on 9 February 2022, at the age of 101.

References

1921 births
2022 deaths
Portuguese revolutionaries
Portuguese communists
Portuguese anti-fascists
20th-century Portuguese politicians
Portuguese Communist Party politicians
Members of the Assembly of the Republic (Portugal)
People from Lisbon
Portuguese centenarians
Men centenarians